Monomatapa is a genus of cicadas in the family Cicadidae. There are at least three described species in Monomatapa.

Species
These three species belong to the genus Monomatapa:
 Monomatapa insignis Distant, 1897 c g
 Monomatapa matoposa Boulard, 1980 c g
 Monomatapa socotrana Distant, 1905 c g
Data sources: i = ITIS, c = Catalogue of Life, g = GBIF, b = Bugguide.net

References

Further reading

 
 
 
 

Lamotialnini
Cicadidae genera